Leland Ossian Howard (June 11, 1857 – May 1, 1950) was a pioneer American entomologist who worked in the US Department of Agriculture. Serving as the chief of the bureau of entomology, a successor to C.V. Riley, he helped establish economic entomology as a profession in the United States and strengthened research activities, helping establish laws to prevent the introduction of agricultural pests. He was a specialist on the Hymenopteran family Chalcididae, which are parasitic and contributed to the introduction of biological control agents for pest management. Howard also took an interest in medical entomology.

Early life
Howard was born to Ossian Gregory Howard, a lawyer, and Lucy Denham Thurber on 11 June 1857. His relatives from his mother's side included the Harvard astronomer E.C. Pickering while other distant relatives included Senator J.M. Howard and President William Howard Taft. Shortly after his birth, the family moved from Rockford, to Ithaca, New York where his father worked with a law firm. 

An interest in insect collecting was encouraged by his parents with the gift of The Butterfly Hunters by Mary Treat at the age of 10, followed by more books. At the age of 13, along with another collector friend, he recorded the introduction of the European cabbage butterfly (Pieris rapae) in the Catskill region. Howard attended Ithaca Academy.  Along with his friends, he founded the Ithaca Natural History Society to meet and discuss papers and insects. 

While out collecting one day, Howard met John Henry Comstock, who invited him to his lab at Cornell University. Howard enrolled in Cornell in September 1873, three years after the death of his father, and following the advice of his mother's friends, went to study civil engineering. Doing poorly in differential calculus made him drop engineering and he began to study other subjects including French, German, and Italian. He then joined Comstock's lab as the first research student and graduated in June 1877 with a thesis on respiration in the larva of Corydalis cornutus. Howard worked with Burt Green Wilder and Simon Henry Gage and received a masters at Cornell.

In the 1880s, Howard also attended Columbian College (now George Washington University) for medicine, although he didn't complete it. He however received an honorary MD from the same university in 1911 for his contribution to medical entomology.

Career
In July 1878, on the recommendation of Professor Comstock, Howard applied for a post in the U.S. Department of Agriculture as an assistant entomologist to C.V. Riley despite the low salary ($100/month) and advice against joining it from many friends and family, he took up the job. Among his first tasks was to prepare a manual on sericulture which was published with Riley as the author. Riley was replaced by Professor Comstock and again many of his writings went under the authorship of Comstock. This was accepted practice and Howard changed this practice when he rose in authority and ensured that all his co-workers were appropriately credited. He eventually became chief of the Bureau of Entomology in 1894. He held the position until 1 October 1927. He continued to consult the Bureau until officially retiring on 30 June 1931. He worked on the systematics of the parasitic Hymenoptera, biological control, and medical entomology of mosquitoes and flies. 

Howard was the editor of Insect Life, a lecturer on entomology at several colleges and universities, and a contributor to reference books on the subject of entomology. He was made permanent secretary of the American Association for the Advancement of Science, honorary curator in the United States National Museum, and consulting entomologist of the Public Health Service. He was elected to the National Academy of Sciences in 1916 and since 1907 was a Fellow of the Entomological Society of America.

Personal life 
Howard married Marie T. Clifton in 1886, "a girl with a glorious soprano voice", who he met while singing in a choir at college. They had three daughters. Howard was known for his interests in sports.

Publications
The Principal Household Insects of the United States, Authors L. O. Howard and C. L. Marlatt, with a chapter Insects Affecting Dry Vegetable Foods by F. H. Chittenden, U.S. Department of Agriculture, Division of Entomology, 1896
Notes on the Mosquitoes of the United States, U.S. Department of Agriculture, Division of Agriculture, 1900
Mosquitoes, McClure, Phillips & co., 1901
The Insect Book, Doubleday, Page & Company, 1901
Preventive and Remedial Work Against Mosquitoes, U.S. Department of Agriculture, Bureau of Entomology, 1910
The House Fly—Disease Carrier, Frederick A. Stokes company, 1911
Mosquitoes of North and Central America and the West Indies, Authors Leland Ossian Howard, Harrison Gray Dyar Jr., Frederick Knab, Carnegie Institution of Washington, 1917
A History of Applied Entomology (Somewhat Anecdotal), Smithsonian Institute, 1930 Abstract
The Insect Menace, Century, 1931
Fighting the insects: the story of an entomologist, MacMillan, 1933 (autobiography)

References

Sources

External links

National Academy of Sciences Biographical Memoir

1857 births
1950 deaths
American entomologists
American male journalists
Columbian College of Arts and Sciences alumni
American science writers
Writers from Rockford, Illinois
Cornell University College of Agriculture and Life Sciences alumni
Smithsonian Institution people
Fellows of the Entomological Society of America
Members of the United States National Academy of Sciences